, son of Tsunehira, was a kugyō or Japanese court noble of the Kamakura period (1185–1333). He held a regent position kampaku from 1337 to 1338. With a daughter of sangi Fujii Tsuguzane he had a son Michitsugu.

References

Fujiwara clan
Konoe family
1305 births
1354 deaths